A term of endearment is a word or phrase used to address or describe a person, animal or inanimate object for which the speaker feels love or affection. Terms of endearment are used for a variety of reasons, such as parents addressing their children and lovers addressing each other.

Etymology 
Such words may not in their original use bear any resemblance in meaning to the meaning attached when used as a term of endearment, for example calling a significant other "pumpkin". Some words are clearly derived from each other, such as  "sweetheart" and "sweetie", while others bear no etymological resemblance, such as "baby", "babe", and "cutie". "Honey" has been documented as a term of endearment from at least the 14th century. "Baby" was first used in 1839 and "sugar" only appeared as recently as 1930.

Usage 
Each term of endearment has its own connotations, which are highly dependent on the situation they are used in, such as tone of voice, body language, and social context. Saying "Hey baby, you're looking good" varies greatly from the use "Baby, don't swim at the deep end of the pool!" Certain terms can be perceived as offensive or patronizing, depending on the context and speaker.

Feminists have complained that while 'terms of endearment are words used by close friends, families, and lovers...they are also used on women by perfect strangers...double standard' – because 'between strangers terms of endearment imply a judgment of incompetence on the part of the target'. Others have pointed out however that, in an informal setting like a pub, 'the use of terms of endearment here was a positive politeness strategy. A term like "mate", or "sweetie", shifts the focus of the request away from its imposition...toward the camaraderie existing between interlocutors'.

Terms of endearment often 'make use of internal rhyme...[with] still current forms such as lovey-dovey, which appeared in 1819, and honey bunny', or of other duplications. Some such combinations seem nonsensical, odd, or too long, however, such as baby pie or love dear, and are seldom used.

Terms of endearment can lose their original meaning over the course of time: thus for example 'in the early twentieth century the word crumpet was used as a term of endearment by both sexes', before diminishing later into a 'term of objectification' for women.

When proper names escape one, terms of endearment can always substitute. This is described by the psychoanalyst Jacques Lacan: The 'opacity of the ejaculations of love, when, lacking a signifier to name the object of its epithalamium, it employs the crudest trickery of the imaginary. "I'll eat you up....Sweetie!" "You'll love it...Rat!".

Psychiatrist Eric Berne identified the marital game of "Sweetheart", where 'White makes a subtly derogatory remark about Mrs White, disguised as anecdote, and ends: "Isn't that right, sweetheart?" Mrs. White tends to agree...because it would seem surly to disagree with a man who calls one "sweetheart" in public'. Berne points out that 'the more tense the situation, and the closer the game is to exposure, the more bitterly is the word "sweetheart" enunciated'; while the wife's antithesis is either 'to reply: "Yes, honey!"' or to 'respond with a similar "Sweetheart" type anecdote about the husband, saying in effect, "You have a dirty face too, dear"'.

French has all kinds of interesting terms of endearment, including a rather odd assortment of barnyard animals...[like] mon canard (my duck)' – something which may be compared to the British 'baby talk...duckie'.

Literary anecdotes 
 In C. P. Snow's Last Things, the narrator's wife, faced with their son's unconventional marriage, turns to her husband and says: " 'Tell me, Lewis' (actually she used a pet name which meant she needed me) 'is that a real marriage?' "
 Virginia Woolf – 'Mandril or Marmoset for Leonard' her husband – wrote 'the story "Lappin and Lapinova", published in 1938, which describes the death of a marriage when the erotic, escapist fantasy of the animal names is cruelly killed off by the husband'.

See also 
 Diminutive
 Hypocorism
 Nickname

References

Further reading 
 Latin Terms of Endearment and of Family Relationship: A Lexicographical Study Based on Volume VI of the Corpus Inscriptionum Latinarum; By Samuel Glenn Harrod, 1909, University of Michigan.
 A Woman's Place: Rhetoric and Readings for Composing Yourself and Your Prose by Shirley Morahan, Published by SUNY Press, 1981, .
 The Cambridge French-English Thesaurus by Marie-Noëlle Lamy, Richard Towell, Published by Cambridge University Press, 1998, .
 Nicknames, Pet Names, and Metaphors Casnig, John D. 1997–2009. A Language of Metaphors. Kingston, Ontario, Canada: Knowgramming.com

Sociolinguistics
Interpersonal relationships
Romance